Trost may refer to:

People
 Al Trost, United States soccer midfielder
 Barry Trost, American chemist
 Brad Trost, Canadian Member of Parliament
 Carlisle Trost, United States Navy officer
 Dolfi Trost, Romanian surrealist
 Katharina Trost, German track and field athlete
 René Trost, Dutch football defender

Other
 Danish ship Trost, a vessel of the Dano-Norwegian Navy which acted as the flagship for Christian IV's expeditions to Greenland
 Trost & Trost, an architectural firm
 Trost asymmetric allylic alkylation, a chemical reaction developed by Barry Trost
 Trost ligand, a chemical ligand designed by Barry Trost
 Trost ("Consolation"), a piano piece by composer Juan María Solare
 Trost Records, an Austrian record label located in Vienna

See also
 Troost